The East Kerry Junior Football Championship is a Gaelic football competition for teams affiliated to the East Kerry division. All 13 clubs in the division are eligible to compete in this championship, they must compete with their 'B'(Junior) team. A 'B' player is defined as any player who is not a member of the Kerry inter-county panel at senior, junior or under-21 level in the current year, or a player who starts on the first 15 of his club's O'Donoghue Cup (East Kerry Senior Football Championship) team in the current year. The competition has been dominated by three teams, Dr Crokes (six wins), Firies (five wins), and Kilcummin (five wins). The winners receive the O'Sullivan Cup.

Roll of honour

External links
 http://www.eastkerrygaa.com/
 https://web.archive.org/web/20101230181326/http://owenosullivancup.net/

Gaelic football competitions in County Kerry
Junior Gaelic football county championships